The 1991 Miller Lite Hall of Fame Tennis Championships, was a men's tennis tournament played on outdoor grass courts at the Newport Casino  in Newport, Rhode Island, United States that was part of the World Series of the 1991 ATP Tour. It was the 18th edition of the tournament and was held from July 8 through July 14, 1991. Unseeded Bryan Shelton won the singles title.

Finals

Singles
 Bryan Shelton defeated  Javier Frana 3–6, 6–4, 6–4
 It was Shelton's first singles title of his career.

Doubles
 Gianluca Pozzi /  Brett Steven defeated  Javier Frana /  Bruce Steel 6–4, 6–4

References

External links
 ITF tournament edition details

Hall of Fame Tennis Championships
Hall of Fame Open
Hall of Fame Tennis Championships
Hall of Fame Tennis Championships
Hall of Fame Tennis Championships